The 1996–97 NBA season was the Warriors' 51st season in the National Basketball Association, and 35th in the San Francisco Bay Area. Due to extensive renovations at the Oakland Coliseum Arena, the Warriors played their home games at the San Jose Arena this season. In the off-season, the team signed free agent All-Star guard Mark Price, then traded Rony Seikaly to the Orlando Magic in exchange for Felton Spencer, Donald Royal and Jon Koncak at the start of the season. However, Koncak was out for the entire season with a knee injury, and never played for the Warriors. 

The team struggled with a 1–5 start to the season, then later on held a 17–29 record at the All-Star break, and lost seven straight games in March, as B. J. Armstrong played just 49 due to a knee injury, and Bimbo Coles played just 51 games due to a hernia injury. At midseason, the team traded Royal to the Charlotte Hornets in exchange for Scott Burrell. The Warriors lost six of their final eight games, and finished last place in the Pacific Division with a 30–52 record.

Latrell Sprewell led the team with 24.2 points, 6.3 assists and 1.7 steals per game, and was selected for the 1997 NBA All-Star Game, while second-year star Joe Smith continued to show improvement, averaging 18.7 points and 8.5 rebounds per game, Chris Mullin provided the team with 14.5 points per game, and Price contributed 11.3 points and 4.9 assists per game. In addition, Armstrong contributed 7.9 points and 2.6 assists per game, while Donyell Marshall provided with 7.3 points and 4.5 rebounds per game, Coles contributed 6.1 points and 2.9 assists per game, and Spencer averaged 5.1 points and 5.7 rebounds per game.

This season also marked an end of an era, as Mullin was traded to the Indiana Pacers the following season (although he would later on return to Golden State for the 2000–01 season). Also following the season, Price was dealt to the Orlando Magic, while Burrell was sent to the Chicago Bulls, second-year center Andrew DeClercq signed as a free agent with the Boston Celtics, head coach Rick Adelman was fired, and Koncak retired.

Offseason

Draft picks

Roster

Roster Notes
 Center Jon Koncak missed the entire season due to a knee injury, and never played for the Warriors.
 Center Mike Peplowski missed the entire season due to a torn knee ligament, and never played for the Warriors.

Regular season

Season standings

z - clinched division title
y - clinched division title
x - clinched playoff spot

Record vs. opponents

Game log

Player statistics

Season

Awards and records

Transactions

Trades

Free agents

Player Transactions Citation:

References

See also
 1996-97 NBA season

Golden State Warriors seasons
Golden
Golden
Golden State